F0 or F00 may refer to:
 HMS Jervis (F00), a 1938 British Royal Navy J-class destroyer
 F-Zero, a futuristic racing video game series
 F00, Dementia in Alzheimer's disease ICD-10 code
 F0, Fundamental frequency
 BYD F0, a car manufactured by BYD Auto
 The lowest tornado intensity on the Fujita scale

See also
 Foo, a metasyntactic variable